Michael Hough may refer to:

 Michael Hough (bishop), Anglican Bishop of Ballarat in Australia
 Michael Hough (politician) (born 1979), American politician in the Maryland Senate
 Mike Hough (Michael Lloyd Hough, born 1963), Canadian professional ice hockey player
 Jack Hough (Michael William Hough, 1916–1971), Australian politician